The Barbados First Division is the second-tier league of football in Barbados. It is organized by the Barbados Football Association.

List of Champions

References

External links
Barbados Football Association page

Football leagues in Barbados
Second level football leagues in the Caribbean